Bashundhara Kings Arena is a football stadium in the Bashundhara Sports Complex, which is the home of Bashundhara Kings and Sheikh Russel KC. Bashundhara Sports Complex is located in Dhaka, Bangladesh which is considered as one of the largest sports complex in Bangladesh. It has been designed by Architect Mohammad Foyez Ullah of Volumezero Limited. The stadium was opened to the public on 17 February 2022. It has a seating capacity of 14,000.

History 
The first match, a BPL fixture between Bashundhara Kings and Bangladesh Police FC held on 17 February, won by Kings 3–0, with the first-ever goal at the stadium scored by Robson Azevedo da Silva.

See also
List of football stadiums in Bangladesh

References

External links 

Sports venues in Dhaka
Football venues in Bangladesh
Sports venues completed in 2022
2022 establishments in Bangladesh